The Leeds municipal elections were held on Saturday 1 November 1947, with one third of the seats, as well as a vacancy in Pottermewton, up for election. With no Liberal candidate this time, East Hunslet went unopposed.

Following favourable national patterns, the swing of two percent to the Conservatives helped the party decisively win the popular vote and, in part thanks to a spike in turnout to 55.3%, gain new post-war records in both share and votes. Despite a deficit of over 20,000 votes and losses totalling seven seats to the Conservatives, Labour were still able to pip them in seats won by an additional seat. As such, Labour's majority was cut by close to a third, but remained safe at 30.

Election result

The result had the following consequences for the total number of seats on the council after the elections:

Ward results

References

Leeds City Council election
1947
City Council election, 1947
Leeds City Council election